Stade Robert Champroux is a multi-use stadium in Marcory, in a suburb of Abidjan, Côte d'Ivoire.  It is currently used mostly for football matches. It serves as a home ground of Jeunesse Club d'Abidjan, Stade d'Abidjan and Stella Club d'Adjamé. The stadium holds 10,000 people. Rugby union club TBO sometimes use the Stade Robert Champroux for matches.

References 

Football venues in Ivory Coast
Sport in Abidjan
Stella Club d'Adjamé
Buildings and structures in Abidjan